Thennamanadu is a village panchayat in Orattanadu Block of Thanjavur district in Tamil Nadu, South India. It is located between the cities of Thanjavur and Pattukkottai,  from Thanjavur,  from Orathanadu and 339 km (211 mi) from state capital Chennai.

Alivoikkal (3 KM), Ayangudi (3 KM), Orattanadu (3 KM), Sethurayankudikadu (4 KM), Mela Ulur (5 KM) are the nearby villages to Thennamanadu. Thennamanadu is surrounded by Nanjikottai Block towards west, Thiruvonam Block towards South, Thanjavur Block towards North, and Ammapettai Block towards North.

This Place is in the border of the Thanjavur District and Pudukkottai District. Pudukkottai District Karambakudi is South towards this place.

There is no railway station near to Thennamanadu in less than 10 km.

Locality Name: Thennamanadu (தென்னமநாடு)

Telephone Code / Std Code: 04372

Thennamanadu Pin code is 614625 and postal head office is Orattanad.

History 
During 883 ACE, a Pandiya King Pandi Undan built the Shiva temple. The temple was named Thennavan Nadu, now Thennamanadu. The Kalyana Odai River runs through the village which was constructed by British rulers around 1935 AD.

Geography and climate 
Thennamanadu has an average elevation of 2 m (6.6 ft). The village lies on the bank of Kalyana odai river (the south branch of Kaveri River).

The Boundary sites of the village are;

East: Oorachi Long Mannargudi

West: Sethurayankudikkadu Long Vallam

North: Paruthikottai Long Thanjavur

South: Orathanadu Long Pattukkottai

Southwest: Mandalakottai Long Pudukkottai

Block Name: Orattanadu

District: Thanjavur

State: Tamil Nadu

Elevation / Altitude: 49 meters. Above Sea level

The maximum temperature is approximately 36 °C during April - May and the minimum temperature approximately 22.8 °C from December to January.

Demographics 
Tamil is the Local Language here.

Politics 
Dravida Munnetra Kazhagam (DMK) and All India Anna Dravida Munnetra Kazhagam (AIADMK) are the major political parties in this area.

Nearby Polling Stations/Booths 

 Panchayat Union Middle School
 Ramajayam (aided) Elementary School
 Sri Ramavilas Aided Elementary School

Nearby Govt Health Centers 

 Thennamanadu, Health Sub Centre, Thennamanadu, Vandaiyar Iruppu
 Orathanadu, Government hospital, Thanjavur Main Road
 Kannanthangudi west, Health Sub Centre, Kannanthankudi (W), Thondarampattu

Division and population 
The Panchayath consists of 12 Karai (division) including Sethurayankudikkadu. The population of Thennamanadu is 4,965, including 2,337 males and 2,628 females. The sex ratio is 1,137 females per 1,000 males. The literacy rate is 65.76%.

Occupation and culture 
The main occupation of the people is agriculture. Paddy, pulses, groundnut, gingelly and sugarcane are the main field crops and coconut, cashew, mango and banana are the important tree crops. The river Kallyanaodai is the main water resource.

This village consists of people from several religions and castes such as Kallar, Adidhiravidas, Vannas, Kosavas, Valayas, Asari, Parisaris, Ambalakaras, Konars, Chettiyar, Malayalis, Muslims and Christians. Kallas is the higher populated people among all other castes in this village. A village panchayat system is there which consists of elderly wise persons from all castes to solve any issues of the village. The social relationship of people of various castes has been slowly getting better after the 1990s. But it is a very good village as it possesses good natural resources, geo locality, topography, village planning, transportation etc.

Education 
Thennamanadu has more number of software engineering professionals, doctors, civil engineers, lawyers, teachers, IAS etc. Also has more number of sports players at state and national level players.

Colleges 

 Thennamanadu Dharmambal Ramasamy Arts and Science College
 Thennamanadu Dharmambal Ramasamy Teachers Training College

Schools 

 Thennamanadu Sri Rama Vilas Govt Aided High School 
 Thennamanadu Government Middle School
 Thennamanadu Government Primary School (ADW)
 Thennamanadu Raja Rajan Primary School

Libraries 

 Thennamanadu Government Public Library

Festivals and Celebrations 
Festivals in the Thennamanadu;

 Mariamman Temple Thiruvizha during the month of April and May
 Throbathai Ammam Theemithi Thiruvizha during the month of March
 Sithirai and Panguni Parkudam and Kavadi Thiruvizha
 Maasi Maham in Sannithi Amman Temple
 Pongal Vizhaiyattu Vizha
 Uzhavar Dina Maadu Vidum Vizha

Sri Thogai Malai Ayyanar Koil has situated nearby the Vallam Road bus stop. It is situated inside the Adhidhravidar street. Theethara Appchi Temple is a famous temple in Thennamanadu. Vembaiyannar Temple is the God in Sethurayar & Thuraiundar kula theivam. In the bank of the "Ammini Pond" is situated Vinayaka, a big Muni Veeran Statue, and some family gods temple.

Thirumeni Pattan Temple is God and kula theivam for Madurayar and situated at bank of the "Ammini Pond".

References

External links
 Location map

Villages in Thanjavur district